Cutaneous endometriosis is characterized by the appearance of papules at the umbilicus or in lower abdominal scars after gynecologic surgery in middle-aged women. The size averages to 2 cm in diameter. Its colour ranges from blue to violet, brown or skin-coloured.

Rarely, endometriosis may present inside the muscles of the abdominal wall instead of the skin after caesarean section.

See also
Endometriosis
Skin lesion

References

Dermal and subcutaneous growths
Endometriosis